Volotovsky District is an administrative and municipal district (raion), one of the twenty-one in Novgorod Oblast, Russia. It is located in the southwest of the oblast and borders with Shimsky District in the north, Starorussky District in the east, Poddorsky District in the south, Dedovichsky District of Pskov Oblast in the southwest, Dnovsky District of Pskov Oblast in the west, and with Soletsky District in the northwest. Its administrative center is the rural locality (a settlement) of Volot. District's population:  6,106 (2002 Census);  The population of Volot accounts for 40.7% of the district's total population.

Geography
The district is located at the Ilmen Depression, southwest of Lake Ilmen. It belongs to the basin of Lake Ilmen, with the rivers in the north draining directly into the lake (the biggest such rivers are the Psizha, the Perekhoda, and the Chernets). The rivers in the southeastern part of the district drain into the Polist River, with the Snezha River being its biggest tributary within the district. The northern part of the district lies in the basin of the Shelon River. Lake Dolzhino in the south is the biggest lake in the district and belongs to the basin of the Perekhoda.

The landscape of the district is almost flat with hills separating river valleys.

Swamps cover up to 25% of the district's territory. Most of the swamps are located in the river valleys, and most of them in the south of the district. About half of the territory is covered by temperate broadleaf and mixed forest.

History
In the 19th century, the area was a part of Starorussky Uyezd of Novgorod Governorate. In August 1927, the governorates and uyezds were abolished. Volotovsky District, with the administrative center in the railway station of Volot, was established within Novgorod Okrug of Leningrad Oblast effective October 1, 1927. It included parts of former Starorussky Uyezd. On July 23, 1930, the okrugs were abolished, and the districts were directly subordinated to the oblast. On January 1, 1932, Volotovsky District was abolished and split between Dedovichsky, Dnovsky, Soletsky, and Starorussky Districts. On February 15, 1935, it was re-established. Between July 28, 1941 and February 24, 1944, Volotovsky District was occupied by German troops. An extended underground resistance organization was active in the district at the time of occupation. On July 5, 1944, Volotovsky District was transferred to newly established Novgorod Oblast. On February 1, 1963, the district was abolished in the course of the Nikita Khrushchev's administrative reform. On November 3, 1965, Volotovsky District was re-established.

Economy

Industry
The industry of the district is represented by small enterprises, mainly of food industry.

Agriculture
As of 2012, three large-scale farms and nineteen mid-scale farms were operating in the district. The main agricultural specializations were meat and milk production, as well as crop growing.

Transportation
A railway which connects Bologoye and Pskov via Staraya Russa crosses the district from east to west. The main station within the district is Volot.

Volot is connected by roads with Staraya Russa and Soltsy. There are also local roads.

Culture and recreation
The district contains fifty-two objects classified as cultural and historical heritage of local significance. Many of those are archaeological sites.

References

Notes

Sources

Districts of Novgorod Oblast
States and territories established in 1927
States and territories disestablished in 1932
States and territories established in 1935
States and territories disestablished in 1963
States and territories established in 1965